The Glengarry Bhoys, founded in 1998, is a Celtic fusion band blending traditional Scottish and Irish music with modern Celtic and contemporary sounds. Initially called the Graham Wright Band, they changed their name to reflect their heritage and the place where they hail from: Glengarry County, Ontario, Canada. The band's original members were Graham Wright (lead vocals, guitars, tin whistle), Gaye Stuart "Ziggy" Leroux (vocals, drums, percussion, bodhran), Ewen McIntosh (bass, vocals) and Derek MacGregor (highland pipes, shuttle pipes, tin whistle).

Ewan and Derek left the band in 2000 and were replaced by a succession of pipers and bassists. In 2002 the band was expanded to include Shelley Downing on fiddle. A permanent bassist, Nigel "Gibby" Bazinet, and permanent piper, James Libbey (highland pipes, small pipes, whistles, keyboards, spoons, trumpet), were found and added to the line-up. In September 2005, Downing, Libbey and Bazinet left the Glengarry Bhoys to pursue other interests. Downing was replaced by Miranda Mulholland (vocals, fiddle), Libbey was replaced with Ewan Brown (highland pipes, shuttle pipes, electric pipes, whistles and vocals) and Bazinet was replaced by Graham Smith (double bass, electric bass).

On October 26, 2007 it was reported that Graham Wright, co-founder and leader of The Glengarry Bhoys, had been experiencing serious medical problems and could no longer tour, resulting in the band disbanding. 
In January 2008 the band announced that Graham was feeling better and was looking forward to touring. On March 28 the Glengarry Bhoys announced a limited return to the touring. Mulholland, Smith, and Brown are no longer with the band; Mulholland has been replaced by D'Arcy Furniss (fiddle) and Steve McIntosh has taken on the role of bassist and piper.

Discography 
 Home Again (aka The Graham Wright Band), 1999
 Full Contact Highlanding, 1999
 The Gathering, 1999
 Exile, 1999
 Juice, 2002
 Rhoots, 2004
 Mountain Road, 2004
 In a Big Country (single), 2004
 Mill Sessions, 2006
 Eight, 2010
 Glengarry Bhoys Compilation, 2011

References

External links
Glengarry Bhoys official website

Musical groups established in 1998
Musical groups from Ontario
Canadian folk rock groups
Canadian Celtic music groups
1998 establishments in Ontario